Cheryl Burke (born May 3, 1984) is an American dancer, model, and television host. She is best known for being a professional dancer on ABC's Dancing with the Stars. She was the first female professional to win the show and the first professional to win twice and also consecutively. She has participated in 26 seasons. She came in second on the NBC series I Can Do That. She replaced Abby Lee Miller on Dance Moms in 2017.

Early life
Burke was born and raised in San Francisco. Burke attended Menlo-Atherton High School.

Dancing with the Stars
Burke won her first mirror ball trophy with 98 Degrees member Drew Lachey in the second season. She won her second championship with retired football star Emmitt Smith in the third season. Burke returned on March 19, 2007, for Season 4, partnered with actor Ian Ziering. She and Ziering were eliminated in the semifinals on May 15, 2007.

Burke participated in a 38-city Dancing with the Stars tour from December 19, 2006, to February 11, 2007. She also joined the second summer tour, which visited 24 cities between June 20, 2007, in Austin, Texas, and July 24, 2007, in Vancouver, British Columbia. Lachey was her celebrity partner for each tour. Burke competed on season 5 with Las Vegas entertainer Wayne Newton. They were the third couple eliminated from the competition, on October 9, 2007.

Burke participated with both Lachey and Newton in the Dancing with the Stars winter tour that kicked off December 18, 2007, in Seattle, Washington. The tour wrapped in Philadelphia on February 10, 2008. Burke competed on season 6 with actor Cristián de la Fuente. They trained at Palm Beach, Florida's, Paramount Ballroom. They made it to the finals and on May 20, 2008, placed third.

Burke returned to the show for season 7 with partner Maurice Greene. They were eliminated in week 8 on November 11, 2008, and finished in fifth place. She returned to the show's eighth season with actor Gilles Marini. They finished as runners-up, losing to Shawn Johnson and Mark Ballas. Burke competed on the ninth season with former U.S. House of Representatives Majority Leader Tom DeLay. On October 6, 2009, they withdrew from the competition because DeLay had stress fractures in both feet.

For Toy Story 3, Burke choreographed the paso doble with Tony Dovolani and did a performance accompanied by the Gipsy Kings live. She  also made a fitness video based on Latin dances with Maksim Chmerkovskiy as co-instructors.

In season ten she was partnered with Chad Ochocinco. They were eliminated in the semi-finals and came in fourth place. Rick Fox was partnered with Burke in the show's eleventh season. They were voted off in the seventh week of the competition and came in sixth place. For the twelfth season, she was partnered with wrestler Chris Jericho. They were voted off in the sixth week of the competition. In the thirteenth season, Burke was partnered with reality star Rob Kardashian. They came in second place, losing to J.R. Martinez & Karina Smirnoff. In the fourteenth season, Cheryl Burke was partnered with actor William Levy. The couple made it to the finals and finished in third place.

In Season 15, Burke returned with former partner and season 3 Champion, Emmitt Smith for a chance to win another mirrorball trophy. They were eliminated in the semi-finals. For season 16, Burke was partnered with comedian D.L. Hughley, finishing in ninth place after being eliminated in the fifth week of competition. During week 8, she danced a Paso Doble with Jacoby Jones and Karina Smirnoff in the trio challenge. For season 17, she was partnered with media personality Jack Osbourne. Osbourne's struggle with multiple sclerosis was a source of inspiration to Burke. They made it to the finals and ended up receiving third place.

For season 18, she was paired with game show host and actor Drew Carey. They were eliminated on week 6 and ended in eighth place. For season 19, she was paired with soap star Antonio Sabàto Jr. The couple was eliminated on week 7 and finished in eighth place. After Season 19, Burke chose to leave DWTS for some time after her contract expired to pursue other projects.

On August 30, 2016, it was announced that Burke would be returning to the show to compete on season 23. She was partnered with Olympic swimmer Ryan Lochte. After a season off, Burke again returned for season 25, her 20th season as a pro. She was paired with former NFL wide receiver Terrell Owens
 and finished in sixth place. After taking another season off, she returned once again for season 27 where she was paired with actor Juan Pablo Di Pace. They were shockingly eliminated in the semi-finals despite earning five perfect scores and holding the highest average of the season.

Burke returned again for season 28 where she was partnered with former NFL linebacker Ray Lewis. However, on week 3, the couple withdrew from the competition due to Lewis suffering a torn tendon in his foot. For season 29, she was partnered with Backstreet Boys singer AJ McLean, coming in seventh place.
On September 8, 2021, it was announced that Burke will be partnered with Cody Rigsby (fan favorite Peloton instructor) for the 30th season of DWTS. She was partnered with Good Morning America meteorologist Sam Champion for season 31. On November 20, 2022, it was announced that Burke would leave the show as a pro dancer after season 31 finale.

Performances

Season 2: Celebrity Partner Drew Lachey
Average: 27.7
Placed: 1st

Season 3: Celebrity Partner Emmitt Smith
Average: 26.8
Placed: 1st

Season 4: Celebrity Partner Ian Ziering
Average: 24.8
Placed: 4th

Season 5: Celebrity Partner Wayne Newton
Average: 17.3
Placed: 10th

Season 6: Celebrity Partner Cristián de la Fuente
Average: 25.2
Placed: 3rd

Season 7: Celebrity Partner Maurice Greene
Average: 22.9
Placed: 5th

Score was awarded by stand in judge Michael Flatley.

Season 8: Celebrity Partner Gilles Marini
Average: 28.1
Placed: 2nd

Season 9: Celebrity Partner Tom DeLay
Average: 16.3
Placed: 13th

Score was awarded by stand in judge Baz Luhrmann.

Season 10: Celebrity Partner Chad Ochocinco
Average: 22.2
Placed: 4th

Season 11: Celebrity Partner Rick Fox
Average: 22.3 (as of October 4, 2010)
Placed: 6th
Week 4 – Double Score Showdown – Technique/Performance score

Season 12: Celebrity Partner Chris Jericho
Average: 22.3
Placed: 7th

Season 13: Celebrity Partner Rob Kardashian
Average: 25.1
Placed: 2nd

Season 14: Celebrity Partner William Levy
Average: 27.5
Placed: 3rd

Season 15: Celebrity Partner Emmitt Smith
Average: 26.7
Placed: 4th

Season 16: Celebrity partner D.L. Hughley
Average: 16.6
Place: 9th

Season 17: Celebrity partner Jack Osbourne
Average score: 26.1
Placed: 3rd

Season 18: Celebrity partner Drew Carey
Average: 22.0
Place: 8th

1Score by guest judge Robin Roberts.

2For this week only, as part of the "Partner Switch-Up" week, Drew Carey did not perform with Burke and instead performed with Witney Carson. Burke performed with James Maslow.

3Score by guest judge Julianne Hough.

4Score by guest judge Donny Osmond.

5Score by guest judge Redfoo.

Season 19: Celebrity partner Antonio Sabàto Jr.
Average: 28.6
Placed: 8th

1Score given by guest judge Kevin Hart in place of Goodman.

2The American public scored the dance in place of Goodman with the averaged score being counted alongside the three other judges.

3This week only, for "Partner Switch-Up" week, Sabàto Jr. performed with Allison Holker instead of Burke. Burke performed with Alfonso Ribeiro.

4Score given by guest judge Jessie J in place of Goodman.

5Score given by guest judge Pitbull in place of Goodman.

Season 23: Celebrity partner Ryan Lochte
Average: 28.9
Placed: 7th

1 Score given by guest judge Pitbull.

Season 25: Celebrity partner Terrell Owens
Average: 22.8
Place: 6th

1 Score given by guest judge Shania Twain.

Season 27: Celebrity partner Juan Pablo Di Pace
Average: 27.5
Place: 5th

Season 28: Celebrity partner Ray Lewis
Average: 15.0
Place: 11th

Season 29: Celebrity partner AJ McLean
Average: 22.9
Place: 7th

Season 30: Celebrity partner Cody Rigsby
Average: 32.1
Place: 3rd

Season 31: Celebrity partner Sam Champion
Average: 24.0
Place: 13th

Other television 
Burke had a guest role on the Disney Channel series The Suite Life of Zack & Cody, in the episode "Loosely Ballroom" along with fellow Dancing professionals Louis van Amstel, Ashly DelGrosso, and Lacey Schwimmer. She portrayed Shannon, a nurse attending to the ensemble cast during a dance contest at the series setting, The Tipton Hotel. In the final round of the competition, Burke's character volunteers to replace an ill competitor (Carey). She and her partner, Esteban, go on to win the competition.

She finished in second place on the first season of I Can Do That, losing to Nicole Scherzinger on the final three-person-super-group performance, having led the competition since week 2. She replaced Abby Lee Miller on Dance Moms in 2017. She took over the ALDC Elite competition team while on the show. The team was then named “The Irreplaceable’s” via when Abby used to call them all “replaceable”.

Burke appeared on Hell's Kitchen as a VIP guest diner in the ninth episode of Season 17.

Awards and honors
2005 World Cup Professional Rising Star Latin Champion
2005 San Francisco Latin Champion
2005 Ohio Star Ball Rising Star Latin Champion
UK Championships
4th in U.S. in the "Under 21s."
 Two-time Dancing with the Stars champion – Season 2 with Drew Lachey, Season 3 with Emmitt Smith
Prime Time Emmy 2006, Outstanding Choreography
On October 20, 2007, Cheryl won the Role Model Award at the 7th Annual Filipino/American Library Gala.
On the 2008 Asian Excellence Awards, she won the Viewer's Choice award for Favorite T.V. Personality.

Personal life

In 2011, Burke released her autobiography, Dancing Lessons. She describes how at age 5 she was molested by a handyman who worked for her family; he repeatedly fondled her. Her sister was also abused by the same man, later identified as Gerry Depaula. At the time she believed it was wrong behavior but wanted to gain his affection. Burke testified against Depaula at age 6, leading to him being sentenced to 24 years in prison. He was released in 2008. Burke said that she is fearful of Depaula.

Burke has done numerous promotions outside of Dancing with the Stars which include Depend Silhouette briefs, Impress Nails and Sargento Cheese. Her partnership with these companies has raised a lot of money including $50,000 that Depend is donating to Dress for Success. She opened her first dance studio in April 2008 and created her own line of activewear the next year.

In 2017, People and Us Weekly reported Burke was dating actor Matthew Lawrence. The two first met in 2006, when Lawrence's brother, Joey, was cast on DWTS. Burke and Lawrence previously dated from 2007 to 2008. Lawrence proposed to Burke on May 3, 2018 which was her 34th birthday. On May 23, 2019, she married Lawrence in San Diego, California. On February 23, 2022, it was reported that Burke filed for divorce. The divorce was finalized on September 19, 2022.

Burke suffers from tendinitis. She says that Transcendental Meditation and therapy have helped her through a lot, including her recent divorce from Matthew Lawrence.

References

External links

Official web site for Cheryl Burke Dance
Official web site for Cheryl Burke
Dancing with the Stars biography
My Ox Is Broken Interview (2006)

Cheryl Burke interview

1984 births
Living people
American ballroom dancers
People from Atherton, California
Dancing with the Stars (American TV series) winners
American female dancers
Dancers from California
American choreographers
American people of Filipino descent
21st-century American women